The Verdun Maple Leafs was the name of three ice hockey clubs that existed in Verdun, Quebec, including a senior hockey team, and two junior teams. The Maple Leafs played home games at the Verdun Auditorium.

History
The first club was a senior hockey team established in the early 1920s. They played in the Montreal City Hockey League until 1937, then switched to the Quebec Senior Hockey League. The team folded after 1942 at the onset of World War II. This senior team coexisted with its farm club, a junior team from 1933 to 1950, also known as the Maple Leafs. Verdun were finalists for the Eastern Canadian Championship and the George Richardson Memorial Trophy in 1939 and 1940, but lost both times to the Oshawa Generals.

The Verdun Maple Leafs were revived again in 1963 playing in the Montreal Metropolitan Junior Hockey League. The team switched to the Quebec Junior Hockey League in 1965. Verdun challenged against for the Eastern Canadian Championship in 1968, but were defeated bt the Niagara Falls Flyers. The following season, Verdun was promoted to the Quebec Major Junior Hockey League, where it played from 1969 to 1972. Serge Martel won the Michel Bergeron Trophy as the league's rookie of the year, playing for Verdun in 1969–70.

NHL alumni
List of alumni from the Verdun Maple Leafs who also played in the National Hockey League. Two Hockey Hall of Fame members played for the Maple Leafs. Emile Bouchard and Maurice Richard were teammates during the 1939–40 season.

Senior Verdun Maple Leafs (1924–1942)

Junior Verdun Maple Leafs (1934–1950)

Verdun Maple Leafs (1963–1972)

Season-by-season results
Season-by-season results for the Verdun Maple Leafs of the Quebec Junior Hockey League.

External links
 List of Verdun Maple Leafs alumni

1920s establishments in Canada
1972 disestablishments in Quebec
Defunct Quebec Major Junior Hockey League teams
Ice hockey clubs disestablished in 1972
Sports clubs established in the 1920s
Verdun, Quebec